The César Gaviria Trujillo Viaduct is a cable-stayed bridge connecting the neighbouring cities of Pereira and Dosquebradas in Risaralda, Colombia.  It is one of the longest cable-stayed bridges in South America and, at the time of its completion in 1997, ranked 20th in the world.

The bridge has a total length of 440 metres, including a central span of 211 metres.  There are four traffic lanes and two sidewalks, giving a total width of 26 metres.  There are two towers (Concrete material) that have a height of 56 metres above the deck (Steel structure), which in turn has a maximum height of 55 metres above the Otún River.

The bridge was built by a Brazilian and German consortium (Consortium of Andrade Gutierrez and Walter Bau AG), with assistance from French and Portuguese firms. The fabrication of the Steel structure was contracted to Industrias Metalurgicas Van Dam in Venezuela.  Construction of the bridge took three years and was completed in 1997, at a cost of US$58 million.  Twelve workers died during the construction process.

The bridge has had a significant impact on reducing traffic congestion in the two cities.  It reduced the travel time between them by up to 40 minutes, avoiding the need to descend to the bottom of the river valley.  It also had an important regional effect, through improved transportation links between Manizales, Armenia and Pereira.

The bridge has become infamous as a site for suicides.  From the time of its completion until July 2005, 88 people ended their lives by jumping off the bridge, including people from neighbouring departments who were attracted by the high and accessible structure.  Two people have survived the fall, in one case by landing in a stand of guadua growing by the river.  In a particularly shocking episode in 2003, a woman threw her 2-year-old daughter off the bridge before jumping to her own death with her 7-month-old daughter. In 2008, the government of Pereira demanded the construction of some kind of barrier along the bridge's edges, and, since the barrier's construction, no one has jumped off the bridge.

The bridge is named after Pereira-born César Gaviria Trujillo, president of Colombia from 1990 to 1994.

Notes
 Galindez et al. (2003), page 2.
 Bridge data from Galindez et al. (2003).
 El Pais (2003).
 Inter-American Development Bank (1998).
 El Diario del Otún (2005).
 El Pais (2003).

References
El Diario del Otún (2005), "Trampolín de la Ignominia. 0 y van 90", 29 July 2005. 

El Pais (2003), "Una vía hacia la muerte", Published in El Pais newspaper, 19 January 2003. 

Galindez, N. et al. (2003), "Implementation of a modal identification methodology on the Pereira-Dos Quebradas cable-stayed bridge".  Presented at the 16th ASCE Engineering Mechanics Conference, July 2003, University of Washington, Seattle.  

Inter-American Development Bank (1998), "Graceful span with a heart of steel". 

Buildings and structures in Pereira, Colombia
Cable-stayed bridges in Colombia
Buildings and structures in Risaralda Department
Viaducts
Landmarks in Colombia
Bridges completed in 1997